Curyo is a town in the Mallee Ward of the Shire of Buloke, Victoria, Australia. Curyo has a Grain Depot on the Mildura railway line; however, the station closed to passenger and parcels traffic on 11 November 1975. A CFA fire brigade in the area is located on Pratt Road, adjacent to the grain depot. The post office there opened on 20 January 1900 and was closed on 9 January 1976.
Curyo used to have a football club and a golf course.

References